Subbayya Sivasankaranarayana Pillai (5 April 1901 – 31 August 1950) was an Indian mathematician specialising in number theory. His contribution to Waring's problem was described in 1950 by K. S. Chandrasekharan as "almost certainly his best piece of work and one of the very best achievements in Indian Mathematics since Ramanujan".

Biography
Subbayya Sivasankaranarayana Pillai was born to parents Subbayya Pillai and Gomati Ammal. His mother died a year after his birth and his father when Pillai was in his last year at school.

Pillai did his intermediate course and B.Sc Mathematics in the Scott Christian College at Nagercoil and managed to earn a B.A. degree from Maharaja's college, Trivandrum.

In 1927, Pillai was awarded a research fellowship at the University of Madras to work among professors K. Ananda Rau and Ramaswamy S. Vaidyanathaswamy. He was from 1929 to 1941 at Annamalai University where he worked as a lecturer. It was in Annamalai University that he did his major work in Waring's problem. In 1941 he went to the University of Travancore and a year later to the University of Calcutta as a lecturer (where he was at the invitation of Friedrich Wilhelm Levi).

For his achievements he was invited in August 1950, for a year to visit the Institute for Advanced Study, Princeton, United States. He was also invited to participate in the International Congress of Mathematicians at Harvard University as a delegate of the Madras University but he died during the crash of TWA Flight 903 in Egypt on the way to the conference.

Contributions

The Pillai sequence 1, 4, 27, 1354, ..., is a quickly growing integer sequence in which each term is the sum of the previous term and a prime number whose following prime gap is larger than the previous term. It was studied by Pillai in connection with representing numbers as sums of prime numbers.

References

1901 births
1950 deaths
Scientists from Tamil Nadu
People from Kanyakumari district
20th-century Indian mathematicians
Indian number theorists
Academic staff of the University of Calcutta
Institute for Advanced Study visiting scholars
Academic staff of the University of Madras
Academic staff of Annamalai University
Victims of aviation accidents or incidents in 1950